Pelivan is a commune in Orhei District, Moldova. It is composed of two villages, Cișmea and Pelivan.

References

Communes of Orhei District